The Biden-Ukraine conspiracy theory is a series of false allegations  that Joe Biden, while he was vice president of the United States, engaged in corrupt activities relating to the employment of his son, Hunter Biden, by the Ukrainian gas company Burisma. They were spread primarily in an attempt to damage Joe Biden's reputation during the 2020 presidential campaign. United States intelligence community analysis released in March 2021 found that proxies of Russian intelligence promoted and laundered misleading or unsubstantiated narratives about the Bidens "to US media organizations, US officials, and prominent US individuals, including some close to former President Trump and his administration." The New York Times reported in May 2021 that a federal criminal investigation was examining a possible role by current and former Ukrainian officials, including whether they used former Trump personal attorney Rudy Giuliani, who is the subject of a separate federal investigation, to spread unsubstantiated claims.

The conspiracy theory alleges that then-Vice President Biden withheld loan guarantees to pressure Ukraine into firing a prosecutor to prevent a corruption investigation into Burisma and to protect his son. The United States did withhold government aid to pressure Ukraine into removing the prosecutor, in accord with the official and bipartisan policy of the federal government of the United States. The US government, along with the European Union, the World Bank and the International Monetary Fund, believed the prosecutor to be corrupt and ineffective and too lenient in investigating companies and oligarchs, including Burisma and its owner. A January 2018 video shows Biden taking credit for withholding the loan guarantees to have the prosecutor fired, acting to implement bipartisan US policy rather than for the reasons the conspiracy theory alleges.

Background 

Hunter Biden is a lawyer whose career previously included a period as an executive vice-president at MBNA and three years at the United States Department of Commerce. He then worked as a lobbyist until 2006, when George W. Bush appointed him to the board of directors of Amtrak. Hunter Biden resigned from Amtrak in February 2009, shortly after the inauguration of Barack Obama, when his father Joe Biden became vice-president. He resumed lobbying, and was counsel at the law firm Boies Schiller Flexner LLP, until the Ukrainian oil and gas firm Burisma Holdings hired him in April 2014. As Hunter Biden had no prior experience in Ukraine or the energy sector, some viewed this as a likely attempt to buy influence via his father, though Hunter Biden was hired to conduct general corporate consulting rather than to provide energy expertise. Hunter Biden's employment was described by some as a potential conflict of interest, and advisors to the Obama administration considered the situation awkward.

In October 2020, during the last weeks of the presidential campaign, the New York Post published an article, with the involvement of Donald Trump's personal attorney Giuliani and former chief strategist Steve Bannon, about a found laptop belonging to Hunter Biden. The laptop contained an email, the authenticity of which was later verified by The Washington Post in 2022, showing what the New York Post characterized as a "meeting" between Joe Biden and Vadym Pozharskyi, a Burisma advisor, in 2015, though that characterization was disputed by witnesses. The article's veracity was strongly questioned by most mainstream media outlets, analysts and intelligence officials, due to the chain of custody of the laptop and its contents, and suspicion that it may have been part of a disinformation campaign. The Washington Post was provided data from a Republican activist on a portable drive, which was purported to come from the laptop. The Post confirmed that some of the materials provided to them were genuine, but could not confirm that the materials on the portable drive came from the laptop; the Post also concluded that most of the data could not be verified and fake material may have been mixed in with it. Hunter Biden said that it is possible the laptop could be his.

Viktor Shokin 

Viktor Shokin was appointed to the position of Prosecutor General of Ukraine by Ukrainian president Petro Poroshenko, whom he was loyal to. Representatives of the EU and the United States pressed Poroshenko for his removal as did the World Bank and International Monetary Fund. In March 2016 testimony to the Senate Foreign Relations Committee, former ambassador to Ukraine John E. Herbst stated, "By late fall of 2015, the EU and the United States joined the chorus of those seeking Mr. Shokin's removal" and that Joe Biden "spoke publicly about this before and during his December visit to Kyiv". During the same hearing, assistant secretary of state Victoria Nuland stated, "we have pegged our next $1 billion loan guarantee, first and foremost, to having a rebooting of the reform coalition so that we know who we are working with, but secondarily, to ensuring that the prosecutor general's office gets cleaned up." An overwhelming majority vote in the Ukrainian Parliament in March 2016 led to Shokin's removal from office after an investigation into extortion of another company led to associates who were found in possession of diamonds, cash and other valuables as well as documents and passports belonging to Shokin.

Trump's first impeachment 

Trump's first impeachment charge of abuse of power was triggered by a July 2019 phone call with Ukrainian President Volodymyr Zelenskyy, in which then-President Trump tried to pressure Zelenskyy in a quid pro quo manner to start a publicly announced investigation of Burisma and the Bidens in exchange for the release of congressionally mandated financial and military aid to Ukraine and the promise of a Trump–Zelenskyy meeting at the White House. During the hearings and impeachment trial of President Trump in 2019–20, he and his allies repeatedly alleged that Joe Biden and his son had engaged in corrupt activities in Ukraine. Trump said he planned to make it a major issue during the 2020 United States presidential race, while a Republican-controlled Senate committee carried out an investigation into the allegations in spring 2020. The investigation by the Republican-controlled Senate Homeland Security and Finance Committees concluded in September 2020 that Hunter Biden "cashed in' on his father's name to close lucrative business deals around the world", but that there was no evidence of improper influence or wrongdoing by Joe Biden.

Rudy Giuliani

Working together with Andrii Derkach (an active Russian agent), Dmytro Firtash, and other individuals linked to Russian intelligence and organized crime, Trump's personal attorney, Rudy Giuliani, and his associates spearheaded an effort to gather information in Ukraine to advance the allegations, and Attorney General William Barr confirmed that the Justice Department had created an "intake process" to review Giuliani's findings.

Derkach released snippets of a supposed conversation between Joe Biden and Poroshenko, in which Biden linked loan guarantees to the ouster of Viktor Shokin, the country's corrupt and ineffective prosecutor general. The recordings, which were not verified as authentic and appeared to be heavily edited, did not provide evidence to support the ongoing conspiracy theory that Biden wanted the prosecutor fired to protect his son. In June 2020, Poroshenko denied that Joe Biden ever approached him about Burisma and characterized the recordings as fake. In September 2020, the United States Department of the Treasury sanctioned Derkach, stating he "has been an active Russian agent for over a decade, maintaining close connections with the Russian Intelligence Services". The Treasury Department added that Derkach "waged a covert influence campaign centered on cultivating false and unsubstantiated narratives concerning U.S. officials in the upcoming 2020 Presidential Election," including by the release of "edited audio tapes and other unsupported information with the intent to discredit U.S. officials".

In late 2019, it was revealed that the United States Attorney for the Southern District of New York, which Giuliani had once led, was investigating him for multiple felonies relating to his activities in Ukraine. Intelligence officials warned Ron Johnson, the chairman of the Senate committee investigating the Bidens, that he risked spreading Russian disinformation. The Washington Post reported in October 2020 that American intelligence agencies warned the White House in 2019 that Giuliani was the target of a Russian influence operation, and National Security Advisor Robert O'Brien warned President Trump about accepting what Giuliani told him. While monitoring Russian assets, U.S. intelligence recorded Giuliani communicating with them. According to officials interviewed by The Daily Beast, then-National Security Advisor John Bolton told his staff not to meet with Giuliani, as did his successor Robert C. O'Brien, because Bolton had been informed that Giuliani was spreading conspiracy theories that aligned with Russian interests in disrupting the 2020 election. These officials were also concerned that Giuliani would be used as a conduit for disinformation, including "leaks" of emails that would mix genuine with forged material to implicate Hunter Biden in corrupt dealings. Interviewed by The Daily Beast, Giuliani would later declare that Derkach's being sanctioned was the result of a conspiracy led by George Soros and that "the chance that Derkach is a Russian spy is no better than 50/50".

Ukrainian businessman Hares Youssef told The Times that an associate of Dmytro Firtash asked Youssef to lie about Hunter Biden's business dealings  to damage Joe Biden's presidential campaign, in exchange for a United States visa.

See also 

 Russia investigation origins counter-narrative
 Russian interference in the 2020 United States elections
 Trump–Ukraine scandal#Ukraine and the Bidens

References 

Controversies of the 2020 United States presidential election
Mass media-related controversies in the United States
October 2020 events in the United States
Joe Biden 2020 presidential campaign
Politics of Ukraine
Allegations
2020 in Ukraine
Trump–Ukraine scandal
Conspiracy theories promoted by Donald Trump
Rudy Giuliani
Conspiracy theories in the United States
Hunter Biden